The national ensemble Kyiv Camerata (or Kyivska Camerata) is a musical group in Kyiv. The National Ensemble of soloists Kyivska Camerata is a leading Ukrainian performer of chamber music of different styles. The ensemble's repertoire is remarkably diverse, ranging from works of Vivaldi, Bach, Heiden, Mozart, Wagner, Grig, Chaykovsky, Stravinsky, Sheinberg to the best samples of world avant-garde classics of the second half of the 20th century. Notably, the ensemble focuses on the popularization of modern Ukrainian music and the global representation of Ukrainian composers.

History 
The ensemble was founded by Valery Matyukhin in 1977. Initially, Kyiv Camerata specialized in modern Ukrainian music; later its performances expanded to works of different epochs and genres. In 1993, Kyiv Camerata was granted the status of a state ensemble. In 2000, it became the national ensemble.

Over the years, the ensemble has performed a large number of premieres of contemporary Ukrainian composers: Valentin Silvestrov, Volodymyr Zubytsky, Ivan Karabyts, Yevhen Stankovych, Myroslav Skoryk, O. Kiva, Yuri Ishchenko, Igor Shcherbakov, Anna Gavrilets, K. Tsepkolenko, I. Kyrylina, O. Levkovych, V. Hubarenko, V. Zagortsev, J. Vereshchagin, Z. Almashi, Alexander Shimko and others. The ensemble also collaborates with vocalists Nina Matvienko, Oleksandr Vasylenko, and Lyudmyla Voynarovska.

The ensemble participates in academic music festivals in Ukraine. Furthermore, Kyiv Camerata have toured Germany, Austria, France, the USA, China, Poland, Greece, Russia, the Baltics, Armenia, and Georgia. The ensemble has the status of the official orchestra of the All-Ukrainian Open Music Olympiad "Voice of the Country".

References 

1977 establishments in Ukraine
Institutions with the title of National in Ukraine
Ukrainian orchestras
Classical music